Ernst Mengin (16 June 1893 – 5 January 1973) was a German Mesoamericanist. He studied under Walter Lehmann and Konrad Theodor Preuss, who in turn had studied under Eduard Seler. In 1934 Mengin and his family moved from Berlin to Copenhagen, Denmark, and he delivered lectures at the University of Copenhagen, where he established the University's first course in Central American Indian Language and Culture.

Publications

As author
Das Recht der französisch-reformierten Kirche in Preußen (1929)

As editor
Unos annates histόricos de la natiόn mexicana (1945)
Memorial de Tecpan-Atitlan (Solola). Anales de los Cakchiqueles Historia del antiguo Reino del Cakchiquel dicho de Guatemala (1952)

References

1893 births
1973 deaths
German Mesoamericanists
20th-century Mesoamericanists